Sendura is a village in Kamsaar of Ghazipur District in Uttar Pradesh, India. It was a part of Mircha village and its Gram Panchayat but was later, made a separate village. Most of the people living in Sendura are Hindus but it also has large communities of Muslim Pathans from Mircha village and nearby villages. As of the 2011 census the main village of 27 acres and had 371 house holds.

Historical population

References

Towns and villages in Kamsar